Qeshlaq-e Hezarat Qoli Abu ol Hasan (also Romanized as Qeshlāq-e Ḩez̤arat Qolī Abū ol Ḩasan) is a village in Qeshlaq-e Jonubi Rural District, Qeshlaq Dasht District, Bileh Savar County, Ardabil Province, Iran. At the 2006 census, its population was 16, in 4 families.

References 

Towns and villages in Bileh Savar County